The Bowery Poetry Club is a New York City poetry performance space founded by Bob Holman in 2002.  Located at 308 Bowery, between Bleecker and Houston Streets in Manhattan's East Village, the BPC is a popular meeting place for poets and aspiring artists.

Building history
The building was built in the 1850s as a lumber yard. Its last incarnation before becoming the BPC was as a formica tabletop manufacturer that ran on DC current. Plywood scraps were used to heat the building in a pot-belly stove.

In a 2002 article about the club in The New York Times, Holman talked about the then-risky choice to open the club on Bowery, which at the time was a "skid row":

The Bowery Poetry Club closed for renovations on July 17, 2012 and re-opened in March 2013 as a joint performance venue with Duane Park, which relocated from TriBeCa.  In the process, BPC dropped "Club" from its name, becoming "Bowery Poetry".  The venue presents Duane Park's burlesque performances Tuesdays through Saturdays, with Bowery Poetry presenting shows on Saturday afternoons, Sundays, and Mondays.

Bowery Poetry is operated by Bowery Arts + Science, a non-profit organization founded by Bob Holman, and run by filmmaker and poet Nikhil Melnechuk.

References
Notes

External links
Bowery Poetry Club website
Bowery Arts and Science website
Poems Recorded Live at the Bowery Poetry Club (podcast series)
Archives of Segue Series
Litkicks article on Brooklyn Poetry Day at the Bowery Poetry Club
All About Jazz on a Jazz event at the Bowery Poetry Club
David Amram on playing jazz with poetry at the Bowery Poetry Club and in the 1950s with Jack Kerouac

Entertainment venues in Manhattan
Spoken word
Poetry organizations
Performance art in New York City
Poetry Club
2002 establishments in New York City